Rabbah bar Naḥmani (died c. 320 CE) was a Jewish Talmudist known throughout the Talmud simply as Rabbah. He was a third-generation amora who lived in Sassanian Babylonia.

Biography
Rabbah was a kohen descended from Eli the Judge ( shôfēṭ). He was a student of Rav Huna at Sura and of Judah bar Ezekiel at Pumbedita, and so distinguished himself as a student that Huna seldom decided a question of importance without consulting him.

His brethren in the Talmudic Academies in Syria Palaestina were not pleased with his residence in Babylonia, and wrote to him to come to the Land of Israel, where he would find a teacher in Johanan bar Nappaha, since it would be far better for him, wise though he was, to have a guide than to rely on himself in his studies. Rabbah, however, seems not to have answered this urgent request, and apparently never left Babylonia.

Upon the death of Judah bar Ezekiel, Rabbah succeeded as head of the academy (rêsh mṯivtā) of Pumbedita, and held the post until his death 22 years later. The academy achieved its height under his leadership and he attracted many new students to the academy. During the Kallah months, he is said to have attracted as many as 12,000 students.

Rabbah was hated by residents of Pumbedita for his criticism of their practice of fraud, but loved by his students.

He is also said to have lived in poverty, but little else is known about his private life. He was maligned by his detractors to the Sassanian emperor for leading and teaching bi-annual month-long study gatherings for over twelve thousand people, leading to their being absent at the time of tax collections. The king sent bailiffs to seize him; he fled from city to city and finally into a marsh, where his body was found in a thicket. According to Sherira ben Hanina, he was denounced to the emperor for causing twelve thousand men to be idle during the month of Elul in summer and the month of Adar in winter. The Talmud records that after his death, he was eulogized for seven days.

His nephew was the great scholar Abaye (280–340) who, being an orphan, was raised by Rabbah. He was succeeded by his son, also called Rabbah. Both Rabbah and Abaye were destined to die in the prime of their lives as they were descendants of Eli the Judge, who was cursed that his descendants would die young. However, due to the fact that Rabbah studied Torah he merited to live to the age of 40. Whereas Abaye, who studied Torah and performed extra acts of kindness, lived to the age of 60.

Teaching
He was a great scholar, renowned for his abilities to argue texts, resolve contradictions, and find applications, which gave him the nickname "uprooter of mountains" ( ʿôqer hārîm), as his studies exhibit the power of one who picks up mountains and grinds them against each other. He was also an exceptional teacher. He used to start every lecture with a joke or funny anecdote to get his students in a good mood. He would test the judgment of his audience, implying a mistaken halakha and waiting for his students to find the mistake.

Only about ten of Rabbah's aggadic teachings are recorded; He seem to have concentrated his attention on halakhah, which he endeavored to elucidate by interpreting the mishnaic decisions and the baraitot, and by determining the fundamental reasons for the various Torah and rabbinical laws and explaining the apparent contradictions contained in them. He often asks: "Why did the Torah command this?" "Why did the sages forbid this?" He did not confine his interest to the practical laws of the Mishnah, however, like his teacher Judah bar Ezekiel, but studied all six mishnaic orders, and was the leading authority in the obscure subjects of nega'im and taharot.

He was not the author of Genesis Rabbah or the other midrashic works whose names end in "Rabbah". Genesis Rabbah is named after Hoshayah Rabbah, and the others are named after Genesis Rabbah.

References

Sources
 Encyclopaedia Judaica, 1972, Keter Publishing House, Jerusalem, Israel.
 Sefer Ha-Aggadah (Book of Legends), 1992, Schocken, New York.

Rabbis of Academy of Pumbedita
320 deaths